was the 2nd daimyō of Kakegawa Domain in Tōtōmi Province, (modern-day Shizuoka Prefecture) in mid-Edo period Japan, 6th hereditary chieftain of the Kakegawa-Ōta clan, and a high-level office holder within the Tokugawa shogunate.

Biography
Ōta Sukeyoshi was the second son of Ōta Suketoshi, the daimyō of Kakegawa Domain. Under Shōgun Tokugawa Ieharu, he was appointed as sōshaban in 1768 and Jisha-bugyō in 1755. He rose to the position of Wakadoshiyori from 1781. As daimyō of Kakegawa, he invited the noted Neo-Confucian scholar Matsuzaka Kōdō to reside in his domain. In 1789, Sukeyoshi was appointed Kyoto Shoshidai, the shogunate's official representative to the Court in Kyoto. In 1793, Sukeyoshi rose to the position of rōjū  to the infant shōgun Tokugawa Ienari, a position he held until 1801.

Sukeyoshi died on March 17, 1805. His grave is at the Ōta clan bodaiji of Myōhokke-ji in Mishima, Shizuoka.

References 
 Appert, Georges and H. Kinoshita. (1888).  Ancien Japon. Tokyo: Imprimerie Kokubunsha.
 Papinot, Edmond. (1906) Dictionnaire d'histoire et de géographie du japon. Tokyo: Librarie Sansaisha...Click link for digitized 1906 Nobiliaire du japon (2003)
 The content of much of this article was derived from that of the corresponding article on Japanese Wikipedia.

Notes

|-

Fudai daimyo
Sukeyoshi
Rōjū
Wakadoshiyori
Kyoto Shoshidai
1739 births
1805 deaths